Carlijn Schoutens (born December 12, 1994) is a Dutch-American speed skater who qualified for the U.S. team at the 2018 Winter Olympics in the women's 3000 meter event, the women’s 5000 meter event and the Ladies Team Pursuit.

Early life

Schoutens was born in Trenton, New Jersey, to Dutch parents who were living abroad. When she was 7 months old her family returned to the Netherlands and she grew up in the town of Heemstede. She started speedskating in Haarlem and participated in the Dutch national all-around speed skating championships in 2012/2013 as well as Junior National Championships, where she won multiple medals. Holding two passports, she moved to Salt Lake City after contacting Matt Kooreman, a US Speedskating coach, where she elected to compete for the United States over the Netherlands. Carlijn studies medicine remotely at the Vrije Universiteit Amsterdam.

2018 Olympics
Schoutens qualified for the 2018 Winter Olympics by winning the national title at the United States Olympic Trials in the 3000m and 5000m distances.  She was selected to race in the Team Pursuit where Carlijn won a bronze medal after skating in the semi-final race to help her team, consisting of Heather Bergsma, Brittany Bowe and Mia Kilburg Manganello.

References

External links
 

1994 births
American female speed skaters
Dutch female speed skaters 
Speed skaters at the 2018 Winter Olympics
Medalists at the 2018 Winter Olympics
Olympic medalists in speed skating
Olympic bronze medalists for the United States in speed skating
Sportspeople from Trenton, New Jersey
People from Heemstede
Living people
21st-century American women
Sportspeople from North Holland
21st-century Dutch women